Sageretia brandrethiana is a plant of the genus Sageretia and the family Rhamnaceae. It grows in the orient and northwest India.  The plant produces a sweet fruit that is prized by the Afghans.

References

brandrethiana
Flora of Afghanistan
Flora of India (region)
Flora of Pakistan
Taxa named by James Edward Tierney Aitchison